Danny Winchell (born Daniel Weinshal, September 26, 1926 – February 16, 2011) was an American pop singer, magazine publisher, record producer, music promoter and radio show host.

Musician
As a musician, he released doo-wop recordings on MGM Records and Recorte Records between 1952 and 1959  including a hit with "Carolina in the Morning" in 1952.  Winchell released recordings both solo and as a member of Nino and the Ebb Tides.

Promoter and producer
He was a promotion man at Colpix Records where he became the co-producer of “Blue Moon” by The Marcels, which was #1 on the Billboard Pop chart for three weeks and number one on the R&B chart.  Winchell was directly responsible for Murray the K debuting a pre-release copy of the song on his show on WINS. The K was so impressed with the song, he played it twenty-six times in his four-hour show the first day, making it a hit before it was released.   Winchell was summoned to Colpix boss Paul Wexler's office the next day and reprimanded.

Radio host
In his later years, he hosted a weekly radio show on WAMB in Nashville, Tennessee and wrote a nationally syndicated newspaper column called The Winch Line.

Personal
He died in Nashville in 2011. He was remembered in a tribute to significant musical professionals by The Recording Academy related to the 54th Annual Grammy Awards.

References

External links

1926 births
2011 deaths
Musicians from New York (state)
Radio personalities from New York (state)
Record producers from New York (state)
Doo-wop